Rogério ([ʁuˈʒɛɾiu] or [ʁoˈʒɛɾiu]) is a Portuguese male given name, and a variant of the first name Roger.  It may refer to:

 Rogério Fidélis Régis, or simply Rogério (1976), Brazilian footballer
 Rogério Lourenço (1971), Brazilian footballer
 Rogério Luiz da Silva (1980), Brazilian footballer, also commonly known as Rogério
 Rogério dos Santos Conceição 1984), Brazilian footballer
 Rogério de Assis Silva Coutinho or simply Rogerinho (1987), Brazilian footballer
 Rogério Rodrigues da Silva (1984), Brazilian footballer
 Rogério Gonçalves Martins (1984), Brazilian footballer
 Rogério Ceni (1973) Brazilian footballer
 Rogério Dutra da Silva (1984)
 Antônio Rogério Nogueira (1976) Brazilian martial artist
 Rogério Romero (1969) former backstroke swimmer from Brazil
 Rogério Pinheiro dos Santos (1972), Brazilian footballer.
 Rogério de Almeida Florindo dos Santos
 Rogério Gaúcho (1979)
 Rogério Corrêa (1979), Brazilian former footballer and manager
 Rogério Corrêa (1981), Brazilian former footballer and manager
 Rogério Duprat (1932-2006) Brazilian composer and musician
 Marcos Rogério Oliveira Duarte (1985), Brazilian footballer
 Rogério Bispo (1985) Brazilian long jumper
 Rogério Gonçalves (1959) Portuguese football manager
 Rogério Ferreira (1973) beach volleyball player from Brazil
 Rogério Sampaio (1967) Brazilian judoka and Olympic champion
 Rogério Lobo (1923), commonly known as 'Roger Lobo', a former Hong Kong politician of Macanese descent
 Rogério Oliveira da Silva (1998), Brazilian footballer
 Rogério Fernandes (born 2002), Portuguese football right-back

Portuguese masculine given names